is a former Japanese football player.

Club statistics

References

External links

1987 births
Living people
Waseda University alumni
Association football people from Gunma Prefecture
Japanese footballers
J2 League players
Thespakusatsu Gunma players
Association football forwards